This page shows the results of leadership elections in the Saskatchewan Liberal Party, covering the period from 1905 to the present day. All leadership contests in the Saskatchewan Liberal Party have been determined by delegated conventions.

Liberal leadership convention, 1905

(Held on August 16, 1905.)

Thomas Walter Scott acclaimed

(Note: this convention was held a few weeks before Saskatchewan was officially proclaimed as a Canadian province.)

Developments, 1905-1926

Walter Scott resigned as premier and party leader in 1916, and was replaced by William M. Martin on October 20 of that year. Martin was selected by the Liberal parliamentary caucus; it is assumed that he was subsequently confirmed without opposition at a provincial Liberal convention.

Martin, in turn, resigned in 1922, and was replaced by Charles A. Dunning on April 5 of that year. Dunning, like Martin, was chosen by caucus; it is also assumed that he was later confirmed without opposition by the party.

Liberal leadership convention, 1926

(Held on February 25, 1926.)

GARDINER, James G. acclaimed

(Note:  A.P. McNab, S.J. Latta and C.M. Hamilton were also nominated at the convention, but all three withdrew to make the choice of Gardiner unanimous.)

Developments, 1926-1946

Gardiner resigned as Premier and party leader in 1935 to enter the federal cabinet of W.L.M. King. On October 31, 1935, William John Patterson was the unanimous choice of the provincial Liberal council to take his before. It is assumed that Patterson was approved without opposition at a subsequent party convention.

Liberal leadership convention, 1946

(Held on August 6, 1946.)

TUCKER, Walter 373
E.M. Culliton 250

Liberal leadership convention, 1954

(Held on November 26, 1954.)

Alexander H. McDonald 388
L.B. Thomson 227
Wilf Gardiner 78
John Egnatoff 40
W.J. Simmie 16

Liberal leadership convention, 1959

(Held on September 24, 1959.)

Ross Thatcher
Wilf Gardiner
Frank Foley
Alex Cameron

(Note:  The vote totals were not released, although it is believed that Thatcher won with about 67% support on the first ballot.)

Liberal leadership convention, 1971

(Held on December 11, 1971.)

First ballot:

David Steuart 404
Cy MacDonald 295
George Gordon Leith 171

Second ballot:

David Steuart 535
Cy MacDonald 314

Liberal leadership convention, 1976

(Held on December 11, 1976.)

Edward Cyril Malone 628
Anthony Merchant 521

Liberal leadership convention, 1981

(Held on June 13, 1981.)

Ralph Goodale acclaimed

Liberal leadership convention, 1989

(Held on April 2, 1989.)

Lynda Haverstock
BLAU, June
CURRIE, Neil

(Note:  The results were not announced, but it is believed that Haverstock won by a significant majority on the first ballot.)

Liberal leadership convention, 1996

(Held on November 24, 1996.)

First ballot:

Tom Hengen 350
Jim Melenchuk 332
Ken Krawetz 239
Gerard Aldridge 55

Second ballot:

Jim Melenchuk 383
Tom Hengen 292
Ken Krawetz 279

Third ballot:

Jim Melenchuk 554
Tom Hengen 367

Liberal leadership convention, 2001

(Held on October 27, 2001.)

David Karwacki 430
Jack Hillson 228

Liberal leadership convention, 2009

Ryan Bater' acclaimed

Liberal leadership convention, 2018
Naveed Anwar  was acclaimed on May 5, 2018.

References

Liberal